Lexington is a city in Morrow County, Oregon, United States. The population was 238 at the 2010 census. It is part of the Pendleton–Hermiston Micropolitan Statistical Area.

History
Lexington was named by early settler William Penland for his hometown of Lexington, Kentucky. Lexington post office was established in 1885. 
In 1886, shortly after Morrow County was created, Lexington lost by 33 votes to Heppner in an election to determine the county seat. The city was incorporated in 1903, and had a population of 185 at the 1910 census.

Sheep ranching was important in the region during the days of early settlement by non-natives. It continues in the 21st century and has been joined by wheat farming and cattle ranching as significant uses of the land.

Geography

Willow Creek flows through Lexington, which is downstream of Heppner and upstream of Ione and Arlington.

Route 74 forms part of the Blue Mountain Scenic Byway, a  set of roads connecting Interstate 84 (I-84) along the Columbia River with the North Fork John Day River in the Blue Mountains. Part of the route follows the Willow Creek drainage through Lexington.

Economy and education
As of 2002, Lexington's largest employers were the Morrow County Grain Growers (farms), the Columbia Basin Electric Co-op in Heppner, a metal fabrication company in Heppner, and a small company in Lexington that repaired farm equipment.

The headquarters of the Morrow County School District is in Lexington. The nearest public schools in this district are in Heppner.

Demographics

2010 census
As of the census of 2010, there were 238 people, 94 households, and 70 families residing in the town. The racial makeup of the town was 92.4% White, 0.4% Asian, 1.7% from other races, and 5.5% from two or more races. Hispanic or Latino of any race were 1.3% of the population.

There were 94 households, of which 28.7% had children under the age of 18 living with them, 60.6% were married couples living together, 9.6% had a female householder with no husband present, 4.3% had a male householder with no wife present, and 25.5% were non-families. 17% of all households were made up of individuals, and 8.6% had someone living alone who was 65 years of age or older. The average household size was 2.53 and the average family size was 2.86.

The median age in the town was 43 years. There were 24.4% of residents were under the age of 18; 6.7% were between the ages of 18 and 24; 19.4% were from 25 to 44; 31.9% were from 45 to 64; and 17.6% were 65 years of age or older. The gender makeup of the town was 55% male and 45% female.

2000 census
As of the census of 2000, there were 263 people, 102 households, and 72 families residing in the city. The population density was 637.9 people per square mile (247.7/km). There were 111 housing units at an average density of 269.2 per square mile (104.5/km). The racial makeup of the city was 96.96% White, 1.14% Native American, 0.76% Asian, 0.38% from other races, and 0.76% from two or more races. Hispanic or Latino of any race were 0.38% of the population.

There were 102 households, out of which 29.4% had children under the age of 18 living with them, 64.7% were married couples living together, 4.9% had a female householder with no husband present, and 29.4% were non-families. 20.6% of all households were made up of individuals, and 12.7% had someone living alone who was 65 years of age or older. The average household size was 2.58 and the average family size was 3.03.

In the city, the population was spread out, with 24.3% under the age of 18, 6.8% from 18 to 24, 28.1% from 25 to 44, 24.7% from 45 to 64, and 16.0% who were 65 years of age or older. The median age was 42 years. For every 100 females, there were 107.1 males. For every 100 females age 18 and over, there were 103.1 males.

The median income for a household in the city was $43,125, and the median income for a family was $50,625. Males had a median income of $37,969 versus $24,688 for females. The per capita income for the city was $23,152. About 6.7% of families and 12.0% of the population were below the poverty line, including 20.6% of those under the age of 18 and 7.1% of those 65 or older.

Transportation
Lexington Airport, which is open to the public, is about one mile north of the city. Operations involve an average of about 85 aircraft a week, mostly local. Seasonally, many flights are related to agriculture.

See also

 List of cities and unincorporated communities in Oregon

References

External links

 Entry for Lexington in the Oregon Blue Book
 Lexington history from the illustrated histories of Umatilla and Morrow counties, 1902

Cities in Morrow County, Oregon
Cities in Oregon
Pendleton–Hermiston Micropolitan Statistical Area
1885 establishments in Oregon
Populated places established in 1885